In mathematics, the icosians are a specific set of Hamiltonian quaternions with the same symmetry as the 600-cell. The term can be used to refer to two related, but distinct, concepts:

 The icosian group: a multiplicative group of 120 quaternions, positioned at the vertices of a 600-cell of unit radius. This group is isomorphic to the binary icosahedral group of order 120.
 The icosian ring: all finite sums of the 120 unit icosians.

Unit icosians
The 120 unit icosians, which form the icosian group, are all even permutations of:

 8 icosians of the form ½(±2, 0, 0, 0)
 16 icosians of the form ½(±1, ±1, ±1, ±1)
 96 icosians of the form ½(0, ±1, ±1/φ, ±φ)

In this case, the vector (a, b, c, d) refers to the quaternion a + bi + cj + dk, and φ represents the golden ratio ( + 1)/2. These 120 vectors form the H4 root system, with a Weyl group of order 14400. In addition to the 120 unit icosians forming the vertices of a 600-cell, the 600 icosians of norm 2 form the vertices of a 120-cell. Other subgroups of icosians correspond to the tesseract, 16-cell and 24-cell.

Icosian ring
The icosians lie in the golden field, (a + b) + (c + d)i + (e + f)j + (g + h)k, where the eight variables are rational numbers. This quaternion is only an icosian if the vector (a, b, c, d, e, f, g, h) is a point on a lattice L, which is isomorphic to an E8 lattice.

More precisely, the quaternion norm of the above element is (a + b)2 + (c + d)2 + (e + f)2 + (g + h)2.  Its Euclidean norm is defined as u + v if the quaternion norm is u + v.  This Euclidean norm defines a quadratic form on L, under which the lattice is isomorphic to the E8 lattice.

Indeed, a linear isomorphism that preserves the quaternion norm also preserves the Euclidean norm.

References
 John H. Conway, Neil Sloane: Sphere Packings, Lattices and Groups (2nd edition)
 John H. Conway, Heidi Burgiel, Chaim Goodman-Strauss: The Symmetries of Things (2008)
 Frans Marcelis Icosians and ADE 
 Adam P. Goucher Good fibrations

Quaternions
John Horton Conway